Naqib Nangarhari (born 29 July 1998) is an Afghan cricketer. He made his first-class debut for Speen Ghar Region in the 2017–18 Ahmad Shah Abdali 4-day Tournament on 7 December 2017. He made his List A debut for Speen Ghar Region in the 2018 Ghazi Amanullah Khan Regional One Day Tournament on 25 July 2018.

References

External links
 

1998 births
Living people
Afghan cricketers
Spin Ghar Tigers cricketers
Place of birth missing (living people)